Sagar Mishra (born 15 September 1993) is an Indian cricketer who plays for Railways. He made his first-class debut on 15 November 2015 in the 2015–16 Ranji Trophy.

References

External links
 

1993 births
Living people
Indian cricketers
Railways cricketers
Cricketers from Mumbai